The 1989–90 season saw Rochdale compete in their 16th consecutive season in the Football League Fourth Division.

Statistics
																												
																												

|}

Final League Table

Competitions

Football League Fourth Division

F.A. Cup

League Cup (Littlewoods Challenge Cup)

Associate Members' Cup (Leyland DAF Cup)

Lancashire Cup

References

Rochdale A.F.C. seasons
Rochdale